The following is an incomplete list of association football clubs based in Gabon.
For a complete list see :Category:Football clubs in Gabon

A
AS Mangasport   (Moanda)
ASCM Moanda
AS Pélican (Lambaréné)
AS Stade Mandji

C
Cercle Mbéri Sportif

D
En Avant Estuaire FC

F
FC 105

M
Missile FC

S
Sapins FC
Sogéa FC
Stade d'Akébé
Stade Mandji
Stade Migoveen

U
US Bitam 
US Oyem 
US O’Mbilia Nzami

V
VAC Mouila

External links
 RSSSF

 
Gabon
Football clubs
Football